Sphacteria ( - Sfaktiria) also known as Sphagia (Σφαγία) is a small island at the entrance to the bay of Pylos in the Peloponnese, Greece. It was the site of three battles:

the 425 BC Battle of Sphacteria in the Peloponnesian war. 
the 1825 AD Battle of Sphacteria in the Greek War of Independence from the Ottoman Empire
the 1827 AD Battle of Navarino, also in the Greek War of Independence

References

Ionian Islands
Landforms of Messenia
Pylos
Islands of Peloponnese (region)
Islands of Greece